The list of U.S. states and territories by unemployment rate compares the seasonally adjusted unemployment rates by state and territory, sortable by name, rate, and change. Data are provided by the Bureau of Labor Statistics in its Geographic Profile of Employment and Unemployment publication.
While the non-seasonally adjusted data reflects the actual unemployment rate, the seasonally adjusted data removes time from the equation.

Unemployment rate by jurisdiction
Data for all U.S. states, the District of Columbia and Puerto Rico is from September 2021. Data for the Virgin Islands is from December 2019, data for Guam is from September 2019, and data for American Samoa is from 2018. Since data for the Northern Mariana Islands is from April 2010 (more than ten years old) it is included but not ranked in the table below.

See also
List of U.S. States by employment rate
Job creation index
 Unemployment in the United States

References

External links
 Comparison of Unemployment Benefits by State

Economy of the United States
Unemployment rate
States
unemployment rate
United States, unemployment rate